The Buchanans are an American production team, founded by Wiz Buchanan (aka Jesús Mi Amor) and Dre Vega. Along with later members Kyle "Keyz" Davidson, and Chris Paultre, the Buchanans are also rappers and songwriters.

Life and career
Wiz and Dre are two childhood friends that grew up in the Coney Island section of Brooklyn, New York. Throughout grade school the two completely immersed themselves in hip hop culture, participating in everything from breakdancing, graffiti, to rap. It was not until they duo reached their late teens that they decided to take their musical talents serious. As they explain, "some of our friends started recording songs and making tracks, and it took our interest in music to another level. We decided to pool our money together and purchase recording equipment so we could cut records to the raps we had in our heads. That led to making beats, which broadened our horizons even more." Finding inspiration in Dr. Dre's The Chronic, the duo immediately began crafting their sound. One of their first creations was a track called "What More Can I Say", which found its way on Jay-Z's The Black Album. From there, The Buchanans went on to produce for artists such as Beyoncé, Nas, Dr. Dre, T.I, Lupe Fiasco, Amerie and Fabolous. In 2012, The Buchanans released God Is In The Machine, a mixtape project that features founding member Wiz Buchanan as Jesús Mi Amor.

Production style
The Buchanans mainly produce songs in the hip hop and R&B genres. Their sound is heavily inspired by 1970s soul music and hip hop from the 1980s and 1990s.

Discography

References

External links
Official Website

American record producers
Record production teams